The Calendar (New Style) Act 1750 (24 Geo. II c.23), also known as Chesterfield's Act or (in American usage) the British Calendar Act of 1751, is an Act of the Parliament of Great Britain. Its purpose was for Great Britain and the British Empire to adopt the Gregorian calendar (in effect). The Act also rectified other dating anomalies, such as changing the start of the legal year from 25March to 1January.

The Act elided eleven days from September 1752. It ordered that religious feast days be held on their traditional dates—for example, Christmas Day remained on 25 December. (Easter is a moveable feast: the Act specifies how its date should be calculated.) It ordered that civil and market days be moved forward in the calendar by eleven days—for example the quarter days on which rent was due, salaries paid and new labour contracts agreed—so that no-one should gain or lose by the change and that markets match the agricultural season; it is for this reason that the UK tax year ends on 5 April, being eleven days on from the original quarter-day of 25 March.

Provisions
In summary, the Act has three key elements:

 It acknowledges the practical difficulties created for England by its traditional practice of beginning the year on 25 March, when common practice among its people, as well as legal and common usage in Scotland (since 1600) and most of Europe, was to begin the year on 1 January. Accordingly, the Act provided that "all His Majesty's Dominions" would cease this tradition from the end of December 1751, such that the following day would be 1 January 1752.
 It acknowledges that the Julian calendar still in use in Great Britain and its Dominions had been found to be inaccurate, and that most of Europe had already adopted an (unnamed) revised calendar. The Julian calendar was eleven days ahead of this 'New Style' calendar. With this Act, therefore, Britain adopted the Gregorian calendar (implicitly but not explicitly). To do so, it ordered that eleven days be removed from September 1752 and that centennial years no longer be leap years unless divisible by 400.
 An annexe to the Act gives a method to calculate the dates of Easter by varying slightly the traditional method of the Church of England (rather than by adopting the method of Pope Gregory XIII).

The Act also provides that fixed religious feast days continue to be observed on the same calendar date, whereas movable feasts (whose dates depend on the date of Easter) would follow from the new rules for its calculation. Religious feast days were to be held to their nominal dates (for example Michaelmas, on 29 September), but the Act also requires that the dates of 'fairs and marts' traditionally associated with those feasts (but in reality tied to the seasons), be moved in the calendar by discounting eleven days. Thus, for example, the Michaelmas hiring and mop fairs moved to 10 October and became known as Old Michaelmas Day. Christmas Day was still celebrated on 25 December and an 'Old Christmas' was not formalised: nevertheless, some communities were reluctant to accept the change.

The Act includes various measures to prevent injustice and other problems. For example, Section VI, echoing a rule in Gregory's reform, provides that the date on which rents and other debts are due must be deferred by 11 days. In addition, the same Section says a person does not reach a particular age, including especially the age of majority (21), until the complete number of years have passed.

In addition, the Act finally settles the position of leap day in English law as 29 February.

Background and context

New Year's Day 

By the 18th century, the English legal year used for legal, financial and other civil purposes had for centuries begun on 25 March, or Lady Day. Thus, for example, 24 March 1707 was immediately followed by 25 March 1708, while the day following 31 December 1708 was 1 January 1708, with 1709 still nearly three months away. The introduction to the Act states succinctly the rationale for a change to the start of the year in England (and Wales) to 1 January: the March date had been found to have many inconveniences. It differed from the date (1 January) used by Scotland, which had ceased to use 25 March in 1600, as well as that used by other neighbouring countries and ordinary people throughout the kingdom. As a consequence, it says, frequent mistakes were made in the dates of deeds and other writings.

In The Twelve Caesars, Suetonius wrote that the Julian calendar, introduced by Julius Caesar in 45 BC as consul, continued the old Roman practice of beginning the year with 1 January. Later Christians, however, felt that 1 January had no religious significance and wanted to begin the year on a more appropriate date, resulting in a great variety of dates being used during the medieval period. No civil legislation or religious canon law ordered this change, but Christmas Day on 25 December gradually became a popular date for New Year in England from the 6th century, though this custom fell almost entirely out of use by the beginning of the 14th century. It is not wholly clear why 25 March came to be settled on as the beginning of the legal year instead, though it saw use in Aquitaine during the 10th century and Normandy by the 11th (shortly before the Norman Conquest). The 11th century also saw dedications to the Virgin Mary go from being rare in England to the most frequent, signifying the increasing importance of Lady Day in the liturgical year. Despite being commonplace by the middle of the 12th century, however, it then gave way to the invariable use of the regnal year for legal records from the reign of Henry II, though its legal status was cemented by its use in official Parliamentary records from the 16th century onwards. From the 13th century, there also arose the curious phenomenon of New Year's Day being almost universally celebrated on 1 January, despite the recorded year not incrementing until 25 March.

However, it was the continuation of the Roman calendar layout beginning with January that eventually led European countries in the 16th century to return to a legal year that started on 1 January: for example the Venetian Republic (1522, sixty years before the Gregorian reform), France (1564) and Scotland (1600). By 1750 most of Europe had already made this change and the continuing English practice became a source of confusion for English merchants and diplomats and their counterparts, when dealing across the Channel or with Scotland. An informal system of 'dual dating' had developed to help reduce confusion. For example, a date written as 21 January 1719/20 (or ) means both a date of 21 January 1719 (where the year began ten months earlier, on 25 March 1719, as in England) and a date of 21 January 1720 (where the year began three weeks earlier, on 1 January 1720, as in Scotland). These notations both refer to the same day in the real world. The Calendar (New Style) Act 1750 removed this difficulty by changing the start of the year to 1 January for England and Wales and the colonies. The change applied "after the last day of December 1751". The legal year which began on 25 March 1751 became a short year of 282 days, running from 25 March 1751 to 31 December 1751. The following year began as 1 January 1752 (New Style).

The eleven day shift 

The reason given to discard both the traditional calendar and the eleven-day accumulated difference was a religious one: calculation of the date of Easter. The introduction to the Act explains that, due to the inaccuracy in the Julian calendar, the date of the spring equinox (which determines the date of Easter) had drifted by about eleven days from its date at the time of the First Council of Nicaea, 21 March, and that this drift would continue unless the calendar was corrected and the eleven days' difference deleted.

The Gregorian calendar was a reform of the Julian calendar, instituted by Pope Gregory XIII in 1582 by the papal bull "" (""). The intention expressed by the text of this bull was to reset the calendar so that celestial events critical for the calculation of Easter dates—the March equinox and its adjacent full moons—would be back in what the bull calls "their proper places" and would be prevented from being moved away again. The divergence had happened because the Julian calendar adds a leap year every four years, but this process adds about three more days every four hundred years than the earth's orbit requires. By 1582, the error had accumulated to the extent that the calendar date of the spring equinox had moved from 21 March by about ten days.

Gregory's reform removed ten days from the Julian calendar, thus resetting 21 March to coincide with the equinox. The reform also provided a new method for calculating leap years so that the error would not recur. Under the Julian calendar a leap year fell every four years when the year was evenly divisible by four. The second part of Gregory's change declared that a centennial year would not be a leap year unless it was further evenly divisible by 400: Section II of the Act replicates this algorithm. By 1750, almost all countries in Western Christendom except Britain and its empire had already adopted Gregory's reform.

According to Gregory's rule, the year 1600 was a leap year, but 1700 was not—but it remained a leap year under the Julian calendar. This meant that when Britain reformed the calendar in the 1750s, the divergence between the calendars had reached eleven days. Section I of the Act corrects this divergence by providing that Wednesday, 2 September 1752 be followed by Thursday, 14 September 1752.

Calculation of the date of Easter: the Computus 

The Annex to the Act gives the algorithm (formally, 'the Computus') to be used thereafter in the Church of England's Book of Common Prayer to establish the date of Easter: this replaced the previous rules used by the Church. However, with the potential for religious strife in mind, the promoters of the Bill downplayed the Roman Catholic connection. The Parliamentary drafters of the Act, and of the associated text to revise the Book of Common Prayer, were careful to minimise the impact on religious sensitivities by expressing the revision in terms consistent with the traditional method of the Church of England. They had reason to be cautious: the Government of Elizabeth I had first attempted to reform the calendar in 1583/1584, but the Anglican hierarchy of the day rejected the proposal because of its Popish origins. Again, when Sir Isaac Newton renewed the campaign to correct the calendar in 1699, his proposal foundered on doctrinal objections. The Annex established a computation for the date of Easter that achieved the same result as Gregory's rules, without actually referring to him. The algorithm, set out in the Book of Common Prayer as required by the Act, includes calculation of the Golden Number and the Sunday Letter needed for the Anglican method. The Annex includes the definition: "Easter-day (on which the rest depend) is always the first Sunday after the Full Moon, which happens upon, or next after the Twenty-first Day of March. And if the Full Moon happens upon a Sunday, Easter-day is the Sunday after". The Annexe uses the terms 'Paschal Full Moon' and 'Ecclesiastical Full Moon', making it clear that they only approximate to the real full moon.

In his The Book of Almanacs (1851) Augustus De Morgan (Professor of Mathematics at University College London), commented on the definition of Easter in the Calendar (New Style) Act 1750. He noted that the body of the Act wrongly stated the way Easter was calculated, but that the annexed Tables correctly set out the dates for Easter as prescribed by Pope Gregory.

Leap day

Until the 1662 edition of the Book of Common Prayer, England followed the practice of the early Julian calendar period of creating a leap day by having two successive days numbered 24 February. The Book of Common Prayer (1662) included a calendar which used entirely consecutive day counting and showed leap day as falling on 29 February.

Section II of the Calendar (New Style) Act contains the new Gregorian rule for determining leap years in the future and also makes it quite clear that leap years contain 366 days. In addition, the calendar at the end of this Act confirms that leap day falls on 29February.

Passage through Parliament

Today, a major reform of this kind would be a government bill, but this was a Private Member's Bill, proposed in the House of Lords on 25 February 1750 [8 March 1751 Gregorian] by Philip Stanhope, 4th Earl of Chesterfield. The proposition was seconded in detail by George Parker, 2nd Earl of Macclesfield, whom Chesterfield described as one of the greatest mathematicians and astronomers in Europe. Macclesfield had contributed the technical knowledge underlying the reform with support from Martin Folkes (then president of the Royal Society) and James Bradley (the astronomer royal). Bradley devised the revised Easter tables. Peter Davall, a barrister of the Middle Temple, who was also an astronomer and formerly secretary to the Royal Society, drafted the Bill. The prime minister the Duke of Newcastle, opposed the Bill and asked Chesterfield to abandon it, but the Government did not block it and the Bill passed in the Lords without further debate.

The House of Commons passed the Bill on 13 May [N.S. 24 May] 1751; it received royal assent on 22 May [N.S. 2 June] 1751.

Title of the Act 

The title of the Act is: An Act for regulating the Commencement of the Year, and for correcting the Calendar now in Use.

It was not the practice in the 18th century to give short titles to Acts of Parliament. The old long titles had proved increasingly inconvenient, and it became the custom to refer to Acts by informal popular names. The Short Titles Act 1896 retrospectively gave short titles to old statutes that had not been repealed. In particular, the 1896 Act conferred the short title Calendar (New Style) Act 1750 on this Act.

Date of the Act 
It may seem strange to modern readers that the Calendar (New Style) Act has the date of 1750 when Royal Assent was given on 22 May 1751. The reason is that, before the Acts of Parliament (Commencement) Act 1793, the date on which a Bill became law was the first day of the Parliamentary Session in which it was passed, unless the Act contained a provision to the contrary.

The calendar reform bill was introduced in the session which began on 17 January 1750 Old Style [N.S.28 January 1751], almost nine months into a year that had begun on 23March 1750. Hence the Short Titles Act 1896 assigned the calendar reform to 1750.

Territorial scope of the Act
The Calendar (New Style) Act 1750 applied to those countries and dominions in Europe, Asia, Africa, and America that belonged or were subject to the crown of Great Britain.

Wales
After the conquest of Wales by Edward I of England, English law was increasingly applied. Various Acts passed by the Parliament of England between 1535 and 1542 consolidated the combination of England and Wales as a single jurisdiction. Nevertheless, before the Wales and Berwick Act 1746 (20 Geo. 2, c42) it was often uncertain whether a reference to 'England' in legislation of the London Parliament included Wales. The 1746 Act provided that in all legislation, past and future, the word 'England' was deemed to include Wales and thus the Calendar Act (four years later) applied to Wales, despite it not being named explicitly.

Scotland 

As part of the Kingdom of Great Britain since the Acts of Union 1707, the Act applied equally to Scotland as to England. Scotland had already made part of the change: its calendar year had begun on 1 January since 1600. The example of Continental countries prompted King James VI of Scotland and his council to make the change, as the Register of the Scottish Privy Council of 17 December 1599 records.

Ireland 

At the time, the Kingdom of Ireland was a semi-autonomous kingdom in a personal union with the Kingdom of Great Britain. The Declaratory Act 1719 asserted that the Parliament of Great Britain had the right to legislate for Ireland, which was one of His Majesty's Dominions. Nevertheless, in 1782, the Parliament of Ireland enacted a statute to confirm the application of the 1750 Act to Ireland. Whatever the  status of the British Act in Ireland, it was applied immediately , as recorded in the ready reckoner printed in Faulkner's Dublin Journal for 1752.

Isle of Man
In January 1753, Tynwald, the Isle of Man's legislature, passed an Act for regulating the Commencement of the Year, and for establishing the new Calendar now used in England, now referred to as the Gregorian Calendar Act 1753. The Act recited that the island had observed the calendar established by the British Act since 1 January 1752 and made provision in similar terms to the British Act. The Act was promulgated and became law, with retrospective effect, on 5 July 1753. One of its permanent effects was to postpone the holding of the annual sitting of Tynwald at St John's, at which Acts of Tynwald were and still are promulgated, from 24 June (the feast of St John the Baptist) to 5 July.

America 

The Calendar (New Style) Act 1750 applied to Britain's American colonies: the north-eastern states of the present day United States and part of Canada. Some British law, including the 1750 Act, is still applicable in some US states because when American independence was declared in 1776, it was not practical for these former colonies to create an entirely new body of American law to replace British law. The practical solution adopted was to continue to apply British law as it stood in 1776 but subject to the proviso that it could be overridden by any subsequent provision of American law, and did not conflict with the Constitution and laws of the United States.

James Bryan Whitfield, a former Florida Supreme Court judge, together with others, produced a comprehensive list of the relevant measures in 1941. This built on earlier work by Missouri. The list includes the key part of the Calendar (New Style) Act 1750.

Some states adopted as their common law the laws of England as it was in 1607, predating the 1750 Act.

There is no US federal calendar law.

The Act remains directly in force in Canada as part of Canadian law.

Other former British colonies 

The Calendar (New Style) Act 1750 applies directly or indirectly in other former British colonies.

Early Australian colonial legislation applied British law.<ref>{{Cite web |title=Australian Courts Act 1828 |url=https://www.foundingdocs.gov.au/resources/transcripts/nsw4_doc_1828.pdf |url-status=live |archive-url=https://web.archive.org/web/20200322110837/https://www.foundingdocs.gov.au/resources/transcripts/nsw4_doc_1828.pdf |archive-date=22 March 2020 |access-date=9 November 2020 |publisher=Government of Australial |page=31 (original), 9 (transcript) |quote=... and be it further enacted that all laws and statutes in force within the realm of England at the time of the passing of this act [...] shall be applied in the administration of justice in the courts of New South Wales and Van Diemen's Land respectively...}}</ref> Subsequently, various reviews have considered the relevance of old British statutes. Australian States eventually repealed British statutes but re-enacted those which remained relevant, such as the Calendar (New Style) Act 1750. For example, New South Wales passed the Imperial Acts Application Act 1969, the First Schedule of which repeals various British statutes including the Calendar (New Style) Act 1750. At the same time Section 16 continues the operation of the British Calendar Act by restating key parts and by referring to that Act for the details.

New Zealand also passed early legislation at various times applying British law. In 1988, New Zealand enacted the Imperial Laws Application Act 1988, which disapplied all but a limited schedule of English Acts it declared to be "part of the laws of New Zealand", one of which is the Calendar (New Style) Act 1750.

Asia and Africa
Britain had by this time begun colonising India and parts of Africa—hence the references to Asia and Africa.

Europe
Apart from Great Britain and Ireland, the only part of Europe under effective British sovereignty was Gibraltar. However, each session of Parliament began with a recital that the King was also the rightful King of France.

Reaction and effect

"Give us our eleven days!" – the calendar riot myth  

Some history books report rioting in reaction to the calendar change, with people demanding that their 'eleven days' be returned. However, this is very likely a myth, based on just two primary sourcesThe World, a satirical journal of Lord Chesterfield, and An Election Entertainment, a painting by the satirist William Hogarth. There are no contemporary records of any such events in the riot depositions at the Public Record Office.

This is the same Lord Chesterfield who introduced the Bill to the House of Lords. He wrote to his son (without saying which 'numerous assembly' he had in mind), "Every numerous assembly is a mob, let the individuals who compose it be what they will. Mere sense is never to be talked to a mob; their passions, their sentiments, their senses and their seeming interests alone are to be applied to. Understanding have they collectively none."

When the son of the Earl of Macclesfield (who had been influential in passing the Act) stood for Parliament in Oxfordshire as a Whig in 1754, dissatisfaction with the calendar reform was one of a number of issues raised by his Tory opponents. In 1755, Hogarth produced a painting (and an engraved print from the painting) loosely based on these elections, entitled An Election Entertainment, which shows a placard carrying the slogan "Give us our Eleven Days" (on the floor, lower right). In his book Hogarth, His Life, Art and Times (1993), Ronald Paulson says of the picture that "the Oxfordshire people ... are specifically rioting, as historically the London crowd did, to preserve the 'Eleven Days' the government stole from them in September 1752 by changing the calendar".

Thus, the 'calendar riot' fiction was born. The election campaign depicted concluded in 1754, after a very lengthy contest between Court Whigs and Jacobite Tories. Every issue between the two factions was brought up, including the question of calendar reform. The Tories attacked the Whigs for every deviation, including their alleged favouritism towards foreign Jews and the 'Popish' calendar. Hogarth's placard, part of a satire on the character of the debate, was not an observation of actual crowd behaviour.

Financial concerns

There were, however, legitimate concerns lest tax and other payments arise any earlier under the new calendar than they would otherwise have done. Consequently, Provision 6 of the Act ('Times of Payment of Rents, Annuities') stipulated that monthly, quarterly or yearly payments would not become due until the days that originally they would have done had the Julian calendar continuedthat is, due dates were deferred by eleven days.

The Earl of Macclesfield, in his speech to the House of Lords during the passage of the Bill, said a proportionate reduction in payments had been considered as an alternative solution. That is, maintaining the original payment dates but reducing the amounts due proportionately to reflect the omission of eleven days from the quarter ending on 29 September 1752 (Michaelmas Day). Macclesfield said this idea was abandoned because it would prove more complex than it first appeared. Despite this, the Treasury later considered legislating to override the Calendar (New Style) Act 1750 provisions by applying proportionate reductions to government payments of interest, salaries and wages, but the idea was abandoned. Nevertheless, the Treasury realised that outside government a proportionate reduction of wages, rents etc. for the short quarter might be convenient in some cases. Dr Robert Poole writes that the Treasury, "decided that a tidy move to new-style quarter day payments might gradually be achieved at the point where old leases expired and new ones began. Tables of abatements ... for the eleven missing days were included in the official information about the changeover and widely published in the press, almanacs and pocket books". For example, The True Briton newspaper of 20 September 1752 reported that the reduction was 7d for each pound or, more precisely, d.

Religious dissent

As already observed, the authors of the Act were careful to minimise the impact on religious sensitivities by expressing the revision in terms consistent with the traditions of the established Church of England, given the experience of previous attempts. By the middle of the 18th Century, however, it seems that the climate had changed somewhat. The traditional saints' days like Lady Day, Michaelmas and Martinmas had come to mark events in the civil calendar such as fair days, rent days and hiring days far more than they did days of special religious observance. Poole writes, "The religious calendar of the established church continued, but it encompassed a shrinking proportion of the population as Dissent expanded at the expense of Anglicanism, and as parish wakes, feasts and saints' days were themselves disowned by many parish clergy." So the Act explicitly exempted fairs and marts from the calendar reform; "that is, they were to change their nominal date to retain the same place in the season, thus in effect observing the Old Style".

The revision to the Book of Common Prayer setting the new basis for calculating the date for Easter (and its associated events like Lent) appears to have passed without public controversy—"perhaps", Poole remarks, "because few people understood how Easter worked anyway". The date of Christmas, however, proved to be a different matter. The Gentleman's Magazine and Historical Chronicle,'' 23 January 1753, reported that a "vast concourse of people" in Somerset gathered at the (Christmas-flowering) Glastonbury thorn on 24 December 1752(New Style) to test the authenticity of the new date. "[B]ut to their great disappointment, there was no appearance of its blowing, which made them watch it narrowly the 5th of Jan. the Christmas-Day, Old-Stile, when it blow'd as usual." The vicar of Glastonbury, however, later announced that it had in fact flowered nearer New Christmas Day. William Dawson (1902) writes a Reverend Francis Blackburne opened his church on Friday, 5 January 1753—(O.S., 25 December 1752)—to a congregation which filled the building. "The people were sorely disappointed, however, when the rector did not use the service designated for Christmas Day but instead, like a crusading clergyman of the twentieth century, preached a sermon on the virtue of obeying the Calendar Act."

Amendments to Calendar (New Style) Act 1750

Calendar Act 1751

The Calendar Act 1751 (25 Geo II c.30) was needed to rectify some unforeseen consequences of the Calendar (New Style) Act 1750.

Section I of the 1751 Act concerned the legal validity of actions that were due to be executed on the omitted eleven days, 3 September to 13 September 1752. The Act provided that for 1752 only, those actions would be deemed to be lawful and to have effect on "the same natural days" as if the reform had not taken place.

Section II addressed calendar dates associated with the opening of common land, the payment of rents, and other matters. Such legal acts as were governed by the dates of movable feasts would thenceforth conform to the dates of those feasts in the revised calendar.

Section III provided that nothing should abridge, extend, or alter the titles of land.

Section IV resolved the date for electing the Mayor of the City of London and also revised an unrelated Act (24 Geo II c.48) that had shortened the Michaelmas term.

25 Geo II c.31
A similar issue was identified shortly afterwards with the date of the "annual election of mayor, sheriffs, treasurers, coroners, and leave-lookers" in Chester "to avoid the inconvenience which would arise to the citizens, from the alteration of the style bringing the ancient day of election into the fair week." The issue was resolved by appending a clause to an otherwise irrelevant Act, (25 Geo II c.31, concerning distemper in cattle) to move its statutory date forward by a week.

Anniversary Days Observance Act 1859

Section III of the Calendar (New Style) Act 1750 required the observation of certain days of political or religious significance. These are listed in a Table headed "Certain Solemn Days for which particular [church] Services are appointed" and are: 5 November (the Gunpowder Plot); 30 January (Execution of Charles I); and 29 May (The Restoration).

As part of the development of religious and political toleration, Section I of the Anniversary Days Observance Act 1859 removed from various Acts, including the Calendar Act, the obligation to commemorate these days with special church services.

Easter Act 1928

The Easter Act 1928 was enacted to permit the date of Easter (as observed by the established church) to be fixed permanently, as the first Sunday after the second Saturday in April. An Order in Council is needed for this Act to come into force and no such order has been made. If so ordered, the 1928 Act would replace the table of "Moveable and Immoveable Feasts" in the Calendar (New Style) Act 1750.

Statute Law Revision Act 1948

The Statute Law Revision Act 1948 simplified and removed some redundant words from Section VI of the Calendar (New Style) Act 1750, including the reference to the time at which the age of 21, or any other age, is reached. The provision about age could only affect those alive at the time of calendar reform. The 1948 Act also repealed the "Table to find Easter till the Year 1899 inclusive" and the "Table of the Moveable Feasts for Fifty two years". By 1948 these tables had ceased to be relevant and this Act deleted them.

Statute Law (Repeals) Act 1971

The calendar included in the Calendar (New Style) Act 1750 is headed "The Calendar, with the Table of Lessons". For each month the morning and evening prayers are specified. The Statute Law (Repeals) Act 1971 removed the words "with the Table of Lessons" and also all the specified prayers in the Table. The changes followed a Law Commission Report and reflected the views of the Church.

Statute Law (Repeals) Act 1986

Section IV of the Calendar (New Style) Act 1750 has provisions about the dates for meetings of courts in Scotland. These were repealed by the Statute Law (Repeals) Act 1986, following a report by the Law Commission and the Scottish Law Commission.

Consequences for income tax year 

In his 1995 paper on the calendar reform, Dr Poole cites the Treasury Board Papers at the National Archives and explains that, after the omission of eleven days in September 1752, the national accounts carried on being drawn up to the same four quarter days as usual but their dates were moved on by eleven days "so that financial transactions should run their full natural term" (and thus Lady Day on 25 March Old Style became 5 April New Style).

See also
 Old Style and New Style dates
 cal (command)#Quirks (1752)

Notes

References

Sources

  
 (This is the original 1750/51 Act, in facsimile image. For clearer text, with long s converted to modern , see British Calendar Act of 1751, the original text of the 1750 Act in plain text (ASCII), from Wikisource.)

 
 
 
 
  (also available as e-book)

External links
 the Act as amended and in force today, from the National Archives
 An act to amend the 1750 Act, from the National Archives 
 Original text of the Act in ASCII, at Wikisource

Calendars
Great Britain Acts of Parliament 1750
Time in the United Kingdom
1750 in science
1750 in Christianity